"Irandek" ( is a Bashkir folk song.

History
According to legend, the song was composed in the 18th century hunter and quray player Bulgair, enchanted by the beauty of the Irendyk ridge.

The first recording of the song "Irendyk" was made by S.Gabyashi and published in the book Bashҡort halҡ yyrҙary (Bashkir folk songs) in 1935. Recorded versions of the song have been performed by Akhmetov, Lebedinsky, Saltykov and Suleymanovym.

Versions of the song and its melody have been written by Kamaeva.

The song has a fervent dancing character and crisp rhythm with rising intonation.

Lyrics sample

References

Bashkir folk songs
Year of song unknown
18th-century songs